Khotan Fernández (born Khotan Fernández Tapajós on April 27, 1973) in Mexico City, Distrito Federal, is a Mexican actor sometimes simply known as Khotan.

Early life
Khotan Fernandez was born in Mexico city, the son of Brazilian actress/singer Rosana Tapajós. While traveling on vacation to Careyes, Mexico, Khotan was called to model for L'Uomo magazine by renowned photographer Nadir. This jump-started a modeling career which then led him to pursue acting. Some of his mentors include Sergio Jiménez, Adriana Barraza and Helena Rojo, a leading film, theater and television actress.

Career
His first important stint was in 1998, playing the role of "Mercurio" in Mi pequeña traviesa produced by Televisa. He subsequently appeared in several soap operas playing "Ransel" in the Preciosa, "Humberto de Astolfi" in Amor Gitano and "Valentino" in Alma Rebelde.  He then moved to Brazil to play "Pablo" in "Vale Todo", the first soap opera produced by O Globo and Telemundo. Ecuavisa then offered him the lead role as "Alvaro Santos" in Yo vendo unos ojos negros. In 2006 Khotan was back in Mexico for the role of "Sergio" in Corazón Partido, a Telemundo and Argos telenovela, in the same year he also starred as "Caronte" in the movie El Cartel. Thereafter came his famous role as villain named "Angel" in another Telemundo serial, Dame Chocolate, with main locations in Miami. In 2009, he played the protagonistic role of David in TV Azteca's Eternamente Tuya, with Fernanda Romero and Marimar Vega. He is recently playing the role of aspiring singer "Rocky Paris" in the new Telemundo series Perro Amor.

In 2012 Khotan guest starred in the Royal Pains episode "Who's Your Daddy", his first English-speaking role, and the first of seven episodes in which he will appear.

In 2017 Khotan appeared in a music video by Jennifer Lopez called "Ni Tú Ni Yo".

Currently 2018 he returned to Telemundo playing Max Sullivan a business man with double life in the soap opera “Al otro día del muro”.

Filmography

References

External links

1973 births
Living people
Mexican male television actors
Mexican expatriates in the United States
Mexican people of Brazilian descent
Mexican male telenovela actors
Male actors from Mexico City